The Gunn Wållgren Award ( Swedish: Gunn Wållgren-stipendiet) is one of Sweden's theatre awards for young actresses. 
It was instituted in the 1980s in memory and honor of  notable Swedish  stage and film actress Gunn Wållgren(1913–1983).  

Grants from the Gunn Wållgren Memorial Fund are jointly awarded by the Royal Dramatic Theater (Kungliga Dramatiska Teatern), the Royal Swedish Opera (Kungliga Operan) and the Royal Swedish Academy of Music (Kungliga Musikaliska Akademien). Awards are given out annually on the anniversary of Wållgren's birthday (November 16) to a young promising Swedish actress of the stage. The prize sum consists of 20,000 Swedish Kronor.

References

Swedish theatre awards